= Ealing Half Marathon =

Annual road-running event in UK

- Date: September
- Location: Ealing
- Event type: Road
- Distance: Half marathon
- Established: 2012; 14 years ago
- Course records: 1:04:15 (men); 1:14:46 (women)
- Website: www.ealinghalfmarathon.com

The Ealing Half Marathon is an annual road running event held on the streets of Ealing, United Kingdom, organised by Ealing Half Marathon CIC.

The first event took place in 2012 and in a short space of time has won awards for being the Number One Half Marathon in the UK, Number One for Atmosphere as well as being in the top 10 Half Marathons of 2012.

== Past winners ==
Key: Course record

Edition	Year	Date	Men's winner	Time (h:m:s)	Women's winner	Time (h:m:s)
1st	2012	30 September	Jonathan Stead (GBR)	1:09:51	Gabriel Carnwath (GBR)	1:23:39
2nd	2013	29 September	Matthew Kiprotich Kimutai (KEN)	1:04:33	Gladys Ruto (KEN)	1:15:28
3rd	2014	28 September	Ben Siwa (UGA)	1:07:33	Gladys Yator (KEN)	1:15:58
4th	2015	27 September	Christopher Cheruiyot (KEN)	1:05:41	Teresiah Omosa (KEN)	1:16:32
5th	2016	25 September	Josphat Kemei (KEN)	1:04:15	Teresiah Omosa (KEN)	1:14:46
6th	2017	24 September	Jonathan Poole (GBR)	1:08:06	Isabel Clark (GBR)	1:17:56
7th	2018	30 September	Jonathan Poole (GBR)	1:09:02	Rachel Thomas (GBR)	1:20:30
8th	2019	29 September	Jonathan Poole (GBR)	1:10:15	Lucie Custance (GBR)	1:19:04
N/A	2020	Cancelled due to the COVID-19 pandemic.				
9th	2021	26 September	Jonathan Poole (GBR)	1:08:50	Melissah Gibson (GBR)	1:19:51
